John Edward Davies (1908–1991) was a Welsh Anglican priest in the second half of the 20th century who rose to become Archdeacon of Wrexham.

Davies was educated at the University of Wales. He was ordained Deacon in 1935; and Priest in 1936. After  curacies in Wrexham and Abergele he was Vicar choral of St Asaph Cathedral from 1942 until 1944. After that he held incumbencies at Llanasa and Mold; and was Cursal Canon at St Asaph from 1965 to 1969.

References

Alumni of the University of Wales
20th-century Welsh Anglican priests
Archdeacons of Wrexham
1908 births
1991 deaths